Eighth Fleet or 8th fleet may refer to:

 8th Fleet (Imperial Japanese Navy)
 United States Eighth Fleet
 Baltic Fleet of the Soviet Navy

See also
 
 
 
 
 Eighth (disambiguation)
 Fleet (disambiguation)
 Seventh Fleet (disambiguation)
 Ninth Fleet (disambiguation)